Ira D. Boyd Stockman (February 12, 1916 – March 10, 1998) was an American actor and stuntman. He was best known for his appearances in the American western television series The Adventures of Kit Carson, and for playing the role of Spud Oxton in the 1955 film The Man from Laramie.

Stockman was born in Redrock, New Mexico, and raised in California. His television credits include Gunsmoke, State Trooper, The Guns of Will Sonnett, The Virginian, The Range Rider, Annie Oakley, Laramie, The Gene Autry Show, Sky King, The Adventures of Wild Bill Hickok, Cimarron City and Tales of Wells Fargo. His film credits include Gun Talk, The Duel at Silver Creek, Outlaw Brand, Beyond the Purple Hills, Texans Never Cry, Westward Ho the Wagons!, Night Passage, West of El Dorado and The Gambler Wore a Gun.

Stockman died in May 1998 in Silver City, New Mexico, at the age of 82.

References

External links 

Rotten Tomatoes profile

1916 births
1998 deaths
People from New Mexico
Male actors from New Mexico
American male film actors
American male television actors
American stunt performers
20th-century American male actors
Male Western (genre) film actors
Western (genre) television actors